Virender Kanwar is an Indian politician. He was elected to the Himachal Pradesh Legislative Assembly from Kutlehar in the 2003, 2007, 2012 and 2017 Himachal Pradesh Legislative Assembly election as a member of the Bharatiya Janata Party. He is Minister of Rural Development, Panchayati Raj, Agriculture, Animal Husbandry and Fisheries in Jai Ram Thakur cabinet.

References

1964 births
Living people
Himachal Pradesh MLAs 2017–2022
Bharatiya Janata Party politicians from Himachal Pradesh
Himachal Pradesh MLAs 2003–2007
Himachal Pradesh MLAs 2007–2012
Himachal Pradesh MLAs 2012–2017